The County of Lytton is one of the 49 counties of South Australia. It was proclaimed 1877 by Governor Anthony Musgrave and named for the Robert Bulwer-Lytton, Earl of Lytton, who was the Viceroy of India at the time. It covers a rectangular portion of unincorporated pastoral land in the state's Far North region. The County of Lytton has never been divided into hundreds.

References

Lytton
L
L